Milton "Milt" Patterson is a former Democratic member of the Illinois House of Representatives, representing the 32nd District on the southwest side of Chicago from 2005 until 2009.

Patterson earned a Bachelor of Science with honors in fire science and fire protection engineering from Southern Illinois University Carbondale, and a master of public administration from University of Illinois at Chicago where he also has done postgraduate study in electrical engineering. He taught circuit analysis and electrical design, and served as Chief Electrical Inspector and Deputy Commissioner of the Chicago Department of Buildings. He also taught courses at Kennedy-King College for a time.

In the 2004 Democratic primary, Patterson defeated seventeen-year incumbent Charles Morrow to represent the 32nd district. The 32nd district at the time included parts of the Greater Grand Crossing, Englewood, West Englewood, Chicago Lawn, Ashburn, and West Lawn.

During the 94th General Assembly, Patterson served on the following committees: Appropriations-Public Safety; Computer Technology; Electric Utility Oversight; Housing and Urban Development. During the 95th General Assembly, Patterson served as the Vice Chair of the Committee on Computer Technology.

After suffering a stroke, Patterson chose to retire and was succeeded by fellow Democrat Andre Thapedi. On January 9, 2009, Patterson was the lone House vote (114–1) against impeaching Governor Rod Blagojevich on corruption charges and committing abuses of power.  In the roll call, Patterson said he didn't feel it was his job to vote to impeach the governor.  He declined to comment on whether he approved of Blagojevich's performance. Patterson defended his vote against impeachment by stating that "I have no firsthand knowledge of any of the evidence," "I went by my own gut feeling, as simple as that," and also that "I read the report. If the government is going to indict him, let them go ahead and do that. That's their job and I'm doing my job."

References

External links
Project Vote Smart - Representative Milton 'Milt' Patterson (IL) profile
Follow the Money - Milton (Milt) Patterson
2006 2004 campaign contributions
Illinois House Democrats - Milton Patterson profile

Politicians from Chicago
University of Illinois Chicago alumni
Living people
21st-century American politicians
Democratic Party members of the Illinois House of Representatives
Year of birth missing (living people)